SCI may refer to:

Companies
Service Corporation International, an American funeral service provider
Shipping Corporation of India
SCI Systems, merged into Sanmina Corporation, electronics manufacturing
SCi Games, a video game publisher

Organizations and sporting

 Safari Club International
 Schistosomiasis Control Initiative
 Scientific Computing and Imaging Institute
 Seamen's Church Institute of New York and New Jersey
 Service Civil International, peace movement
 Silverthorn Collegiate Institute, school in Toronto, Ontario, Canada
 Sister Cities International
 Society of Chemical Industry
 Solar Cookers International
 Sport Club Internacional, a football club in Brazil
 Strategic Computing Initiative, US program to fund AI research
 Sustainable Commodity Initiative
 Systemics, Cybernetics and Informatics, conference later named WMSCI
 Southern Careers Institute

Science
Metcalf Center for Science and Engineering, Boston University, USA
Science Citation Index
Spinal cord injury
Space Competitiveness Index
SCI (calculator mode), display in scientific notation
Science of Creative Intelligence
Science Channel, a US cable television channel
Sci (journal)

Other
Scalable Coherent Interface, former interconnect standard
Sensitive Compartmented Information, US security classification
Serial communication interface, early term for a UART
Site of Community Importance, EU
SCi, a model of Ford Duratec engine
Special Criminal Investigation, a video game
The String Cheese Incident, a jam band
Paramillo Airport (IATA code of SCI)
State Correctional Institution, Pennsylvania Department of Corrections prisons
Summer Camp Island, a Cartoon Network television series

See also
SCIS (disambiguation)